The Peter DeFazio Bridge is a bicycle and pedestrian bridge located in Eugene, Oregon, that crosses the Willamette River. The bridge was completed in 2000 and cost $2.8 million.

See also
 List of crossings of the Willamette River

References

External links

2000 establishments in Oregon
Bridges completed in 2000
Bridges in Lane County, Oregon
Bridges over the Willamette River
Buildings and structures in Eugene, Oregon
Pedestrian bridges in Oregon
Transportation in Eugene, Oregon